Charles Scott Richardson (born 1955 in Regina, Saskatchewan) is a Canadian novelist, and book designer.
His novel, The End of the Alphabet, won the 2008 Commonwealth Writers' Prize for Best first Book, Canada & the Caribbean. He has won the Alcuin Society Award multiple times.

He is Vice President, and Creative Director at Random House of Canada.
He lives in Toronto.

Works

Reviews

References

External links
C.S. Richardson on Book Design, The Casual Optimist, March 9, 2009
Review: The End of the Alphabet by CS Richardson, She Reads Novels, January 26, 2010

Canadian male novelists
1955 births
Living people
Writers from Regina, Saskatchewan